Abdoulkader Thiam (born 3 October 1998) is a Mauritanian professional footballer who plays as a defender for  club Cholet.

Club career
In June 2021, Thiam joined Boulogne. In June 2022, he signed for Cholet.

International career
Thiam was born in Mauritania, and emigrated to France at a young age. Previously a youth international for the France U16s, Thiam was called up to the Mauritania national team for a pair of friendlies in March 2018. On 24 March 2018, he made his debut for Mauritania in a 2–0 friendly win over Guinea.

References

External links
 
 
 
 
 

1998 births
Living people
People from Gorgol Region
Mauritanian footballers
Mauritania international footballers
French footballers
France youth international footballers
French sportspeople of Mauritanian descent
Black French sportspeople
French expatriate footballers
Mauritanian expatriate footballers
Mauritanian expatriate sportspeople in Monaco
French expatriate sportspeople in Monaco
Expatriate footballers in Monaco
Association football defenders
Ligue 1 players
Ligue 2 players
Championnat National players
Championnat National 2 players
Championnat National 3 players
AS Monaco FC players
US Orléans players
US Boulogne players
SO Cholet players
2019 Africa Cup of Nations players
2021 Africa Cup of Nations players